Voltaj (meaning voltage in Romanian) is a Romanian pop rock group.

History

Voltaj was formed in 1982, in Bucharest, by Horațiu Rad on bass, Nikki Dinescu (Krypton) on drums, Gabi Nacu (Krypton) on guitar, Cristi Minculescu (Iris) on vocals and Adrian Ilie (Iris) on guitar. Their sound at the time was on the heavier side of hard rock, being one of the earliest examples of traditional heavy metal in the Romanian scene.

During this period there were numerous changes in the line-up, all the disputes even spawning a second Voltaj, known as Voltaj 88', which also managed to release a couple of albums during the '90s.

By the time of their 1996 debut,"Pericol de Moarte", only drummer Nikki Dinescu was left from the original line-up. The album, which also features Tavi Colen Talisman on vocals, is their only record in the heavy metal style.

Starting with 1998 the two remaining members, bass player Vali Ionescu, and guitar player Gabi Constantin recruit a new line-up, with Bobby Stoica on keyboards which brought Călin Goia on vocals on board. With the release of the album, "Risc Maxim 2", the group switches its style to electronic-influenced pop-rock music. In 2002 they were joined by Oliver Sterian (son of Valeriu Sterian) on drums. Releasing numerous hit singles like "20 ani", "Albinuța", "De mâine", "De la capăt" and "Doar pentru ea", they have become one of the most widely-known groups in Romania.

They won the Best Romanian Act award at the MTV Europe Music Awards 2005. After winning Selecția Națională 2015, they represented Romania in the Eurovision Song Contest 2015 with the song "De la capăt", where they progressed out of their semi-final group to place 15th in the Final with 35 points.

Band members
Călin Goia (vocals)
Gabi "Porcus" Constantin (electric guitar)
Adrian Cristescu (keyboards)
Valeriu "Prunus" Ionescu (bass guitar)
Oliver Sterian (drums)

Discography

Studio albums

Compilation albums

Singles

As lead artist

"—" denotes a single that did not chart or was not released in that territory.

As featured artist

References

External links 

Official site
Interview Bobby Stoica (keyboardist Voltaj)
Interview Calin Goia (singer Voltaj)

Romanian electronic music groups
Musical groups established in 1982
Eurovision Song Contest entrants for Romania
Eurovision Song Contest entrants of 2015
1982 establishments in Romania
MTV Europe Music Award winners
Musical groups from Bucharest